Come on Danger is a 1942 American Western film directed by Edward Killy. It was a remake of a 1932 Tom Keene film. The story was bought for Holt in June 1941.

Plot summary

Cast
 Tim Holt as Jack Mason
 Frances E. Neal as Ann Jordan (as Frances Neal)
 Ray Whitley as Smokey
 Lee 'Lasses' White as Whopper
 Karl Hackett as Ott Ramsey
 Malcolm 'Bud' McTaggart as Russ
 Glenn Strange as Henchman Sloan
 Evelyn Dockson as Aunt Fanny (as Evlynn Dockson)
 Davison Clark as Ranger Captain Blake
 John Elliott as Saunders
 Slim Whitaker as Sheriff (as 'Slim' Whitaker)
 Kate Harrington as Maggie
 Henry Roquemore as Jed

References

External list
 
 
 
 

1942 films
1942 Western (genre) films
American Western (genre) films
RKO Pictures films
Films directed by Edward Killy
Films produced by Bert Gilroy
American black-and-white films
Films scored by Paul Sawtell
1940s American films
1940s English-language films